The 2017 CONMEBOL Recopa was the 25th edition of the CONMEBOL Recopa (also referred to as the Recopa Sudamericana, or ), the football competition organized by CONMEBOL between the winners of the previous season's two major South American club tournaments, the Copa Libertadores and the Copa Sudamericana.

The competition was contested in two-legged home-and-away format between Colombian team Atlético Nacional, the 2016 Copa Libertadores champions, and Brazilian team Chapecoense, the 2016 Copa Sudamericana champions. The first leg was hosted by Chapecoense at Arena Condá in Chapecó on 4 April 2017, while the second leg was hosted by Atlético Nacional at Estadio Atanasio Girardot in Medellín on 10 May 2017.

Atlético Nacional defeated Chapecoense 5–3 on aggregate to win their first Recopa Sudamericana title.

Background
The matches took place during the year after the crash of LaMia Flight 2933, in which 19 Chapecoense players and the club's coach died while travelling to compete in the first leg of the 2016 Copa Sudamericana Final, which was to have taken place at Atlético Nacional's Estadio Atanasio Girardot in Medellín. Following the crash, CONMEBOL awarded the 2016 Copa Sudamericana to Chapecoense, at the request of Atlético Nacional.  The tragedy has produced a friendship between the two clubs: on the scheduled night of the original match, Atlético Nacional held a memorial for the victims attended by over 130,000 people including the mayor of Chapecó, an act that Chapecoense fans offered thanks for in their own club's memorial gathering.

Format
The Recopa Sudamericana was played on a home-and-away two-legged basis, with the Copa Libertadores champions hosting the second leg. If tied on aggregate, the away goals rule would not be used, and 30 minutes of extra time would be played. If still tied after extra time, the penalty shoot-out would be used to determine the winner.

Teams

Venues

Matches

First leg

Second leg

See also
2016 Copa Libertadores Finals
2016 Copa Sudamericana Finals

References

2017
2017 in South American football
Atlético Nacional matches
Associação Chapecoense de Futebol matches
2017 in Colombian football
2017 in Brazilian football
April 2017 sports events in South America
May 2017 sports events in South America